"Whisper in the Dark" is a song recorded by American singer Dionne Warwick. It was written by Edgar Bronfman, Jr. and Bruce Roberts for her studio album Friends (1985). Production on the track was helmed by Albhy Galuten. A drums-heavy pop ballad with synthpop and soft rock elements, "Whisper in the Dark" was released as the album's second single in 1986, and peaked at number 72 on the US Billboard Hot 100.

Background
"Whisper in the Dark" was written by Edgar Bronfman, Jr. and Bruce Roberts and produced by Albhy Galuten for Warwick's seventh album with Arista Records, Friends (1985).

Track listings

Credits and personnel
Credits lifted from the liner notes of Friends .

Edgar Bronfman, Jr. – writer
Albhy Galuten – arranger, producer
Bruce Roberts – writer
Dionne Warwick – vocals

Charts

References

1986 singles
Dionne Warwick songs
1985 songs
Arista Records singles